The 2008 Dickies 500 was a NASCAR Cup Series motor race held on November 2, 2008, at Texas Motor Speedway in Fort Worth, Texas. Contested over 334 laps on the 1.5-mile (2.4 km) asphalt quad-oval, it was the 34th race of the 2008 Sprint Cup Series season. The race was won by Carl Edwards for the Roush Fenway Racing team. Jeff Gordon finished second, and Jamie McMurray clinched third.

Qualifying
Jeff Gordon won the pole position, with Martin Truex Jr. joining him on the front row.

Failed to qualify: Tony Raines (#70), Bryan Clauson (#40), Chad McCumbee (#45), Max Papis (#13), Johnny Sauter (#08).

Recap
Carl Edwards used fuel mileage to sweep the season series at TMS.  Points leader Jimmie Johnson finished one lap down in 15th place, but still led Edwards by 106 points.

References

Dickies 500
Dickies 500
21st century in Fort Worth, Texas
NASCAR races at Texas Motor Speedway
November 2008 sports events in the United States